Agumbe is a village situated in the Thirthahalli taluka of Shivamogga district, Karnataka, India. It is nestled in the thickly forested Malenadu region of the Western Ghats mountain range. Owing to its high rainfall, it has received the epithet of "The Cherrapunji of South India", after Cherrapunji, one of the rainiest places in India.

Agumbe is associated with rainforest conservation efforts, documentation of medicinal plants, tourism (trekking and photography), and the promotion of cottage industry. The Agumbe Rainforest Research Station was established as a sanctuary for the King Cobra, Agumbe's flagship species.

Location 
The coastal town of Udupi hosts the nearest major railway station approximately 50 km (31 mi) . As part of the Western Ghats mountain range, Agumbe lies in a UNESCO World Heritage Site. Agumbe is near the Someshwara Wildlife Sanctuary and the Kudremukh National Park.

Size 
Agumbe is a small hill village with very limited visitor accommodation. The population is approximately 500 people.

Economy 
The villagers of Agumbe are subsistence farmers. Rice and areca are grown. The Raksha Kavacha Weavers' Cooperative Society represents the beginnings of cottage industry in the village.

Tourism
Places in the vicinity of Agumbe that tourists visit include the Kundadri and Kodachadri Hills, Udupi, Malpe, Mangalore (for the airport and seaport), Karkala, Kolluru, Sringeri, Chickmagaluru, Shivamogga, Bhadravathi, N.R. Pura, Sagar, Hosanagar, Koppa and Thirthahalli. In the summer, a truck can be used to reach Narasimha parvata

Sunset Point
Sunset View Point rests on one of the highest peaks of the Western Ghats on the Udupi-Agumbe Road. It is ten minutes walk from Agumbe. On a fine evening, the sunset can be seen over the Arabian Sea.

Geography 
Agumbe lies in a hilly, wet region of the Western Ghat mountains. This geography contributes to its scenery, and suitability for trekking. In addition, there are a number of waterfalls in the locality.

Waterfalls near Agumbe

Barkana Falls 
Barkana Falls (Latitude 13.449315, Longitude 75.136015), Northeast of Agumbe, is 850 ft (259 m) in height. It is the tenth highest falls in India.

Onake Abbi Falls 
Onake Abbi Falls (latitude 13°30'44"N, longitude 75°4'25"E) at 400 feet, is smaller than Barkana Falls. In the Kannada language, "onake" means 'pounding stick', an instrument used by villagers to pound grains to flour. Trekking for 5 km through rainforest is needed in order to reach a view of the falls.

Jogigundi Falls 
Jogigundi is a small water fall near Agumbe. This is about 800m deep. It is usually filled with water.

Koodlu Threetha Falls 
Koodlu Theerthra waterfall is located 25 km from Agumbe.

Sirimane Falls 
Srimane falls is located at about 40 km from Agumbe.

Climate 
Agumbe hosts India's first automatic weather station, founded by Romulus Whitaker b. 1943, New York, NY. Agumbe lies in a rainforest region with a tropical climate, warm and humid. Under the Köppen system of climate classification Agumbe is an 'Am' climate, that is, a tropical monsoon climate. A dense silvery fog forms over the Western Ghats at Agumbe.

Rainfall 
The driest month in Agumbe is February with an average rainfall of 1 mm. The wettest month is July with an average rainfall of 2,647 mm.

The table below is comparison of rainfalls for between Agumbe in Thirthahalli taluk in Shimoga district, Hulikal in Hosanagara taluk in Shimoga district, Amagaon in Khanapur Taluk in Belgaum district and Talacauvery in Madikeri taluk in Kodagu district, Kokalli of Sirsi Taluk, Nilkund of Siddapur Taluk, CastleRock of Supa (Joida) Taluk in Uttara Kannada District to show which one can be called the "Cherrapunji of South India".

Temperature 
Maximum temperatures in Agumbe vary between 24.4 and 31.5 °C. Minimum temperatures vary between 16.2 °C and 21.4 °C. Average temperatures vary between 22.2 °C and 23.6 °C with an annual average temperature of 23.5 °C. April is the hottest month of the year and December the coolest. The average annual variation in temperature is 4.1 °C. The lowest recorded temperature was 3.2 °C in 1975 and the highest, 37 °C in 2008-2009.

Ecology and biodiversity 

Rainforest is a dense, wet, tropical evergreen ecosystem, high in its level of biodiversity. According to the 'Champion and Seth' classification, Agumbe is an area of "Southern tropical wet evergreen forests" (1A/C4). R.S. Troup, an eminent forester of his day, said,
"The tropical evergreen rain forests are characterised by the great luxuriance of their vegetation which consists of several tiers, the highest containing lofty trees...covered by numerous epiphytes"

Agumbe rainforest research station 
The Agumbe Rainforest Research Station was founded in 2005 by Romulus Whitaker, a herpetologist. Whitaker had been familiar with Agumbe since the 1970s when he began studying the King Cobra. Its purpose is to create a local biodiversity database, encourage individual scientific research, collaborate with India's Department of Forestry and conserve the rainforest of the Western Ghats as well as to educate the residents of the region in the importance of forestry conservation. The King Cobra, an endangered species is the station's "flagship species". Funding for the station came from Whitaker's mother, Doris Norden and from the Whitley Award received by Whitaker in 2005.

Medicinal plants conservation area 
The Agumbe Medicinal Plants Conservation Area was established in 1999 to protect the important medicinal plants of the region. The "Foundation for Revitalisation of Local Health Traditions" recorded 371 plant species at Agumbe, of which 182 were medicinal.

Flora 
Endangered plant species
Endangered plant species in the area include

 Dipterocarpus indicus
 Dysoxylum malabaricum
 Calophyllum apetalum
 Garcinia indica
 Garcinia gummi-gutta
 Myristica dactyloides
 Vateria indica
 Aristolochia tagala
 Tarenna agumbensis
 Adenia hondala
 Celastrus paniculatus
 Persea macrantha

Plant species named for Agumbe
 Meliola agumbensis - fungus
 Tarenna agumbensis - shrub
 Hygroaster agumbensis - mushroom
 Dactylaria agumbensis- fungus

Other plant species discovered at Agumbe
 Caudalejeunea pluriplicata - liverwort
 Notothylas dissecta - Hornwort

Fauna 
Mammals
Agumbe provides an environment for large and small mammals such as the endangered lion-tailed macaque, tiger, leopard, sambar, giant squirrel, dhole, a wild dog of India, gaur, the Indian bison and barking deer. 
 
Reptiles and amphibians
In creating funds for conservation of the Agumbe rainforest, the Ophiophagus hannah, king cobra is a 'flagship' species. An Agumbe-based scientific project to radio-locate rescued king cobras aims to determine whether relocation is helpful to their survival. other reptiles and amphibians of the area include the cane turtle and a flying lizard.

Birds
Agumbe is a popular destination for bird watchers and photographers. Among the endemic birds are the Malabar trogon, the yellow-browed bulbul and Sri Lankan frogmouths.

Insects and marine species
Agumbe's many insect species include the Atlas moth, Cyclotoma alleni (a beetle discovered in Agumbe), Selenops agumbensis, a spider and Drosophila agumbensis a small fly species. Cremnoconchus agumbensis is a local small fresh water snail.

Temples 
The Agumbe Venugopalakrishna Hindu temple is an old structure known for beautiful architecture and peacefulness. The temple deity is Sri Venugopala Krishna. An annual fair is conducted each year in February in honour of the deity.

Another local temple is the Sringeri Sharadamba temple.

Malgudi Days 
Malgudi Days (1985) is a television serial directed by Shankar Nag. It was based on novels written by R. K. Narayan. Many episodes were filmed in Agumbe. In 2004, a new set of episodes of Malgudi Days was filmed at Agumbe by Kavitha Lankesh (director).

See also 

Mangalore
Thirthahalli
Udupi
Shimoga
Sringeri

References

External links 

Agumbe
Kunchikal Falls does not exist
Agumbe - Onake Abbi - Jogi Gundi - Malandur - Narasimha Parvatha - Kigge trek

Villages in Shimoga district
Populated places in the Western Ghats
Tourism in Karnataka